Cheese Factory Corner is an unincorporated locality in Hants County, Nova Scotia, located at an intersection between Indian road, Route 202, and Route 14. It is named after a cheese factory that operated there for 6 years, between 1892 and 1898. Local farmers would hold shares in the factory, and would bring their milk to nearby Gore for processing into cheese.

References 

Communities in Hants County, Nova Scotia